Charles Ducasse, known in Spain as Carlos Ducasse (1 May 1932 in Saint-Jean de Luz – 26 October 1983 in Bayonne) was a French footballer. He mostly played for Spanish clubs — one year with Real Sociedad and four years with Real Valladolid.

External links
 Profile
 La Liga profile

1932 births
1983 deaths
French footballers
People from Saint-Jean-de-Luz
French-Basque people
Real Sociedad footballers
Real Valladolid players
La Liga players
Olympique de Marseille players
Olympique Alès players
Ligue 1 players
Association football midfielders
Sportspeople from Pyrénées-Atlantiques
Footballers from Nouvelle-Aquitaine